Kris Reaves (born November 10, 1995) is an American soccer player.

Career

Youth and college
Reaves played two years of college soccer at the University of Portland between 2016 and 2017.

Professional 
On January 10, 2018, Reaves was signed as a homegrown player by FC Dallas.

He was the 20th overall homegrown player signed by FC Dallas. He made his debut on June 29, 2018, starting and playing 78 minutes in a 1–0 victory over Minnesota United.

Reaves was released by Dallas at the end of their 2018 season.

Reaves signed with USL Championship side Colorado Springs Switchbacks FC for the 2019 season.

References

External links 
 

1995 births
Living people
People from Duluth, Georgia
Sportspeople from the Atlanta metropolitan area
Soccer players from Georgia (U.S. state)
Association football defenders
American soccer players
Wake Forest Demon Deacons men's soccer players
Portland Pilots men's soccer players
FC Dallas players
Colorado Springs Switchbacks FC players
Major League Soccer players
USL Championship players
Homegrown Players (MLS)